During the course of the Syrian Civil War limited fighting at the Syria–Turkey border and Turkish military cross-border operations have caused casualties in the Turkish Armed Forces.

List of fatalities by operation
The following is a list of the fatal casualties among the regular Turkish Armed Forces by operation. In total 289–346 Turkish Forces servicemen have been reported killed:

In addition to the military fatalities: one Turkish civilian worker was killed in the area of Operation Olive Branch, two Turkish civilian contractors were killed during operations in the Idlib Governorate and two Turkish civilian drivers were killed in the area of Operation Peace Spring, following the operation's conclusion.

See also 
List of aviation shootdowns and accidents during the Syrian Civil War that include Turkish aircraft lost during the Syrian Civil War.

Notes

References

Syrian civil war
Military personnel killed in the Syrian civil war
Turkish involvement in the Syrian civil war